Chan Sui-kau, GBM, GBS, OBE, JP (22 October 1926 in Dongguan, Guangdong – 27 March 2018) was a Hong Kong industrialist and philanthropist who is the founder of Yangtzekiang Garment Limited and the YGM Group. Due to his contributions on Hong Kong's garment and textile industry, he is nicknamed the "King of Hong Kong's Garment Industry" by the media. Besides serving in the garment industry, Chan, as a pro-Beijing entrepreneur, maintained good relations with the Chinese government, and was appointed as  a National Committee Member of the Chinese People's Political Consultative Conference representing Hong Kong, serving in that post from 1993 to 2003.

Chan held Honorary Doctorates from the Hong Kong Polytechnic University and the City University of Hong Kong. The Chan Sui Kau and Chan Lam Moon Chun Hall in the Hong Kong University of Science and Technology and a sports rehabilitation centre in the Hong Kong Polytechnic University is named after him. Chan was awarded the Grand Bauhinia Medal, the highest award under the Hong Kong honours and awards system on July 1, 2008.

Awards 
1983: Justice of the Peace
1988: OBE
2002: Gold Bauhinia Star
2008: Grand Bauhinia Medal

References 

1926 births
2018 deaths
Hong Kong businesspeople
Recipients of the Gold Bauhinia Star
Recipients of the Grand Bauhinia Medal
Members of the Selection Committee of Hong Kong